Lewis Greene may refer to:

 Lewis Joel Greene (born 1934), American Brazilian biochemist
 Lewis Patrick Greene (1891–1971), English writer of adventure stories